Little Cottonwood Canyon lies within the Wasatch-Cache National Forest along the eastern side of the Salt Lake Valley, roughly 15 miles from Salt Lake City, Utah. The canyon is part of Granite, a CDP and "Community Council" designated by Salt Lake County. The canyon is a glacial trough ("U" shaped canyon), carved by an alpine glacier during the last ice age, 15,000 to 25,000 years ago. A number of rare and endemic plant species are found in the canyon's Albion Basin. Mountain goats inhabit the surrounding mountains.

The Salt Lake Temple of the LDS Church was built of blocks of quartz monzonite, granite, and granodiorite which Latter Day Saint pioneers quarried  from the Little Cottonwood Stock near the mouth of the canyon.

State Route 210 is the primary access road to the canyon, running from the canyon mouth up to Alta. Little Cottonwood Creek runs down the length of the canyon, beginning at Cecret Lake at Alta and flowing westward.

Geology 
The Little Cottonwood stock is a granitic intrusion that extends from the mouth of the canyon almost to Snowbird ski resort. It is Oligocene in age, roughly 30.5 to 29 million years old, composed primarily of granodiorite, quartz monzonite, and granite, with some mafic enclaves. The Little Cottonwood stock is intruded in its northeast corner by another unit called the White Pine intrusion, and other smaller igneous units, collectively about 27-26 million years old, which are the source of the inactive White Pine molybdenum ore deposit in White Pine fork.

The intrusion and its associated ore deposit have several interesting features, including quartz-bearing porphyry, pebble dikes, and other features related to hydrothermal ore deposit processes, and possibly volcanism, that occurred during intrusion.

The intrusion is also the footwall of the East Traverse Mountain Mega-Landslide, and its presence is probably a second-order control on the cause of the landslide, in addition to the elevation gradient caused by the nearby Wasatch Fault.

Recreational activities 
Recreational activities in Little Cottonwood Canyon include hiking, camping, fishing, mountain biking, rock climbing, Bouldering, skiing, snowboarding, and backcountry use. There are two resorts in the canyon, Alta and Snowbird, providing both summer and winter recreational opportunities. The Utah Native Plant Society often conducts wildflower walks at Albion Basin and in other locations in the canyon. The road is approximately 8.3 miles from the base of the canyon to the top with an average grade of 9.2%, making it a popular road cycling challenge.

Skiing and snowboarding 

Little Cottonwood Canyon is home to two ski areas, Snowbird and Alta. Both areas are well known for the amount of snow they receive each year with Alta averaging around 550 inches per year. The canyon is also well known for its backcountry skiing access, with over 300 named backcountry runs including one of the most prominent peaks in the canyon, Mount Superior.

Rock climbing 
The lower third of the canyon is strewn with quartz monzonite, granite, and granodiorite outcroppings, mostly consisting of smooth steep faces, some up to several hundred feet high.  Local climbers informally refer to the rock as granite, which is a close relative to quartz monzonite.

The earliest recorded climbing activity dates from the 1930s, when Harold Goodro put up some routes before shifting to predominantly climbing on the quartzite of Big Cottonwood Canyon and elsewhere. Many of the major routes in Little Cottonwood were established in the early 1960s by the Alpenbock Club, some in conjunction with well-known visitors including Fred Beckey, Layton Kor, and Royal Robbins. The Lowes – George Lowe, Greg Lowe, and Jeff Lowe – came to prominence through the rest of the 1960s and early 1970s. More recent climbers have pushed the standards to the highest levels, establishing several 5.13 routes.

Access can be a problem. On the north side, the "Church Buttress" above the LDS Church vault, and the Black Peeler Buttress, are on private land and not legally accessible, as are parts of the south side. This still leaves some 20-odd named buttresses and gullies available for climbing, mostly on the north side. Approaches involve parking alongside the road and hiking a short distance up through scrub oak, sometimes scrambling through fields of enormous boulders.

Face climbing is the predominant technique, typically using bolts and cracks for protection, but there are many notable crack climbs as well. Most routes are 2-4 pitches in length, with walkoffs involving still more scrub oak.

The highest-quality face routes are to be found on The Fin, an almost-featureless expanse high above the canyon. Its route The Dorsal Fin (5.10d) is a classic of the Wasatch; first ascended by George Lowe and Mark McQuarrie in 1965, the bolts of this four-pitch were all drilled on the lead.

The canyon also includes Gate Buttress, whose 80+ routes include the aptly named Schoolroom (5.6), a five-pitch route requiring a wide variety of techniques, along with routes ranging up to 5.12a in difficulty. Below the buttress and near the road is the Gate Boulder, a popular gathering spot shaded by large trees.

The Pfeifferhorn is one of the highest peaks to climb in the Wasatch. The peak is usually climbed from the Red Pine Lake area, a ten-mile roundtrip climb that gains 3,700 feet. The peak was named after Chuck Pfeiffer, a Wasatch Club leader from long ago.

With 529 climbs currently established, Little Cottonwood Canyon has the second most bouldering routes in Utah.  These routes vary in difficulty, from V0 to V16. Some of the most commonly climbed areas throughout the canyon include Secret Garden, 5 Mile, and White Pine.

Gallery

See also
 List of canyons and gorges in Utah
 Little Cottonwood Creek (Salt Lake County, Utah)

References

Bibliography
 Bret Ruckman and Stuart Ruckman, Wasatch Climbing North (Chockstone Press, 1991)

External links 

 Utah Native Plant Society

Canyons and gorges of Utah
Canyons and gorges of Salt Lake County, Utah
Wasatch Range
Wasatch-Cache National Forest
Climbing areas of Utah
Protected areas of Salt Lake County, Utah